Elliott from Earth is an animated television series created by Guillaume Cassuto, Mic Graves and Tony Hull for Cartoon Network. Produced by Cartoon Network Studios Europe, it premiered in the United Kingdom on March 6, 2021. In the United States, it aired from March 29 to April 9, 2021.

Premise
Eleven-year-old Elliott and his geologist mother Frankie travel around looking for meteorites on Earth, so that Frankie can further study a 65-million-year-old rock which appears to be from space but lacks a fusion crust. One night, the two accidentally power up the rock, revealing it to be alien technology that can turn into a transport sphere and launch into space. The sphere transports them to another side of the Universe, where they end up on a large space station called the Centrium. There, they meet a dinosaur who names himself Mo, and end up losing the rock in the wilderness of a biosphere. The three of them investigate their new environment and meet its alien inhabitants, eventually making their way into the city on the Centrium where they find a new home for themselves. In Centrium City, the trio continues to get accustomed to the ways of life there and explore the wonders of their new home, while Frankie continues her search for answers about the mysterious rock.

Characters

Protagonists
 Elliott (voiced by Samuel Faraci) - An 11-year-old boy who longs to make friends, and finds one in Mo. He is curious and adventurous, and often ends up in strange dilemmas when he does not think things through.
 Mo (voiced by Noah Kaye Bentley) - A nearsighted Stegosaurus who can talk and apparently came from Earth as well. He does not know much about himself—or anything for that matter—but learns quickly. He wears a pair of round, blue glasses previously owned and worn by Frankie. Near the start of the series, he names himself after Elliott's aunt, Maureen "Mo".
 Frankie (voiced by Naomi McDonald) - A 36-year-old single mother of Elliott who is a geologist hoping to study the existence of extraterrestrials. She wears a pair of round, pink glasses. Though she often has a logical and scientific approach to things, she still acts on impulse from time to time when driven by her determination to explore and discover.

Aliens
 105E (voiced by Diane Morgan) - 105E is the first droid Elliott and Frankie meet on the Centrium, as she helps them find out answers as to how they arrived. Dry-witted and impish, she also has the ability to project the memories of others.
 Hive Director (voiced by Angelina Ispani) - Although she looks like a child the Hive Director is really much older as her species ages in reverse, giving her more wisdom than most and making her ideal to run the Hive, the hub of learning on the Centrium.
 Lord Kallous the Merciless (voiced by Stephen Greif) - Lord Kallous the Merciless, or ‘Mr. K’ to his students, has put his past as an intergalactic tyrant behind him. After the destruction of his homeworld (it was only partially his fault), his new life on the Centrium means he often finds himself struggling with an enemy far greater than anything he has faced before: school kids and middle management.
 You (voiced by Mic Graves) - Lord Kallous' last henchman.
 Gym (voiced by Jessie Lawerence) - A fan of herbs and spices, discipline and authority, the Chef runs the lunchroom on the Hive, and teaches Elliott and Mo about the diverse range of things to eat in space, as well as giving them advice on how to stop it from wriggling away.
 Kane (voiced by Rich Hall) - Kane is a gruff two-faced alien who isn’t having the best day when he meets the visitors from Earth, and he has to use all his wit and cunning to help them navigate them through their strange new environment.
 Mrs. Argolis  (voiced by Teresa Gallagher, Naomi McDonald, and Jessica McDonald) - Mrs. Argolis is Elliott and Frankie’s three-headed next-door neighbour who seems to have an issue with nearly everything. Not one for keeping their own noise levels down, they’re more than happy to give their opinions on things, even when they’re not asked.
 Nara (voiced by Mandeep Dhillon) - Elliott and Mo’s friend Nara is very good at planning for the future. Whilst she has a mischievous streak, Elliott and Mo can’t wait to get to know her to see what she can do with her special ability.
 Preston - Preston takes life at a slower pace than Elliott and Mo’s other friends. But, that doesn’t stop him from having fun on the Centrium, with him being known for playing pranks on unsuspecting victors from time to time.
 Earmouse (voiced by Tony Hull) - Earmouse is Elliott and Mo’s classmate, who doesn’t let his tiny size hold him back. Despite his natural squeamishness, he’s always ready to put himself into a new situation, even though he’s usually putting himself in further danger.
 Invisibill - Bill lacks visibility, but makes up for it in confidence, though often what he says isn’t as useful as he thinks.
 Steve - Steve doesn’t let the fact he only has a mouth stop him. Unfortunately, not everyone else agrees, as the wrong things often go in and out of it without Steve knowing.
 Vax and Vox - Vax and Vox have escaped from Planet X and now spend all their time together on the Centrium. They have plenty in common, including size, shape, colour, name, interests, and special abilities, but they can’t understand why everyone keeps asking if they are related.

Casts 

 David Baddiel
 Saul Bearryman
 Gyles Brandreth
 Maria Teresa Creasey
 Simon Day
 Mandeep Dhillon
 Ashton Leon Frank
 Stefan Ashton Frank
 Teresa Gallagher
 Mic Graves
 Stephen Greif
 Rich Hall
 Hugo Harold-Harrison
 Steven Hartley
 Tony Hull
 Angelina Ispani
 Alex Jordan
 Eve Karpf
 Lorelei King
 Jessie Lawrence
 Phyllis Logan
 Adam Long
 Jessica McDonald
 Diane Morgan
 Naoko Mori
 James O'Brien
 Richard Overall
 Rob Rackstraw
 Dan Russell
 Kerry Shale
 Jack Simmons
 Craig Stein
 David Warner

Production 
The show's pitch was greenlit for 20 episodes by Cartoon Network Studios Europe. Production started in September 2018, consisting mostly of the production team from Cartoon Network's The Amazing World of Gumball. The show aired on March 29, 2021, consisting of sixteen 11-minute episodes. In October 2019, the series creator and original showrunner Guillaume Cassuto left the series due to parting ways with Cartoon Network.

On August 17, 2022, it was announced that the HBO Max would be removing several series, including Elliott from Earth.

Episodes 
Every episode was directed by Rhys Byfield and Mikey Please, with Mic Graves and Tony Hull serving as supervising directors.

LGBTQ representation

In the second part of the four-part episode "Wednesday", Frankie, one of the main protagonists of the series, mentions that she and her unnamed wife gave birth to Elliott, revealing Frankie as a lesbian.

References

External links
 

2021 British television series debuts
2021 British television series endings
2020s British animated television series
2020s British children's television series
2020s British comic science fiction television series
British children's animated space adventure television series
British children's animated comic science fiction television series
British children's animated science fantasy television series
British flash animated television series
2021 American television series debuts
2021 American television series endings
2020s American animated television series
2020s American children's television series
2020s American comic science fiction television series
American children's animated space adventure television series
American children's animated comic science fiction television series
American children's animated science fantasy television series
American flash animated television series
English-language television shows
Cartoon Network original programming
Animated television series about children
Television series by Hanna-Barbera Studios Europe
Animated television series about extraterrestrial life
Television series about extraterrestrial life